Erika Büsch Guadalupe (born 22 October 1974) is a Uruguayan popular music composer, guitarist, and singer.

Biography

Artistic field
Büsch's first artistic studies took place at the National Dance School, where she took classes in the history of dance, body expression, music reading, choreography, traditional popular culture, introduction to social sciences, and history of culture.

Later she began guitar studies with the concertists , Eduardo Yur, and Cristina Zárate. After joining the Uruguayan Popular Music Workshop (TUMP), she studied with Ney Peraza,  and Guilherme de Alencar Pinto.

She also studied harmony with the composer .

Subsequently, she worked on the creation of the music group workshop for children "Tucanción", and the children's animation group "Tungaitá".

Tocando el tiempo

In 2002, Büsch independently released her first adult album, entitled Tocando el tiempo. This album, that contains 14 original songs by the artist, is framed in an experimentation stage, with songs that have rhythmic bases as dissimilar as pop, tango, and bossa nova.

Por el gusto de cantar

In 2004 and 2005, Büsch performed a series of shows with Numa Moraes entitled "Por el gusto de cantar" (for the love of singing), during which they performed at the Zitarrosa Hall in Montevideo and made a tour of the interior of Peru. The repertoire of the shows, in addition to including themes of both artists, incorporated works by different Latin American authors such as Silvio Rodríguez, Violeta Parra, Atahualpa Yupanqui, and Carlos Puebla.

In 2006, she traveled to Chile to represent Uruguay at the 47th Viña del Mar International Song Festival, where she participated in the folkloric competition. In that category she performed her song "Sinfonía Nocturna".

Together again with Numa Moraes, in 2008 she started a tour of Canada that led her to give performances, talks, and workshops in cities such as Montreal, Ottawa, Toronto, Calgary, Quebec, Vancouver, and Edmonton.

Discography

For children
 Aserrín aserrán, las canciones de la abuela
 tuhermanaeZ
 Rondas infantiles

For adults
 Tocando el tiempo (Ediciones T.G.B. 2002)
 Por el gusto de cantar (together with Numa Moraes. Montevideo Music Group 3394-2. 2005)

References

External links

 

1974 births
20th-century composers
21st-century Uruguayan women singers
21st-century composers
20th-century Uruguayan women singers
Living people
Singers from Montevideo
Uruguayan composers
Uruguayan guitarists
Uruguayan people of German descent
21st-century guitarists
20th-century women composers
21st-century women composers
21st-century women guitarists